Pir Yadegar (also Romanized as Pīr Yādegār and Pīr Yādgār; also known as Pirdavār and Pīr Dāwar) is a village in Hajjilar-e Shomali Rural District, Hajjilar District, Chaypareh County, West Azerbaijan Province, Iran. At the 2006 census, its population was 232, in 46 families.

References 

Populated places in Chaypareh County